Boquet may refer to:

People
Alfred Boquet (1879–1947), French veterinarian and biologist
 Anne Boquet (born 1952), French senior civil servant
 Jeanne-Angélique Boquet (1717–1814), was a French artist

Places
Boquet, Pennsylvania, U.S. unincorporated community in Westmoreland County, Pennsylvania state
Boquet River, U.S. river in New York State (spelled "Bouquet River" on maps prior to 1982)

See also
Bocquet (disambiguation)
Bouquet (disambiguation)